The Bible Society of India is a Christian body that is authorized to translate, produce, distribute and market the Bible and is a member of the United Bible Societies.

The motto of the Society is to translate the word of God into languages, which people can understand, in a format they have access to, and produce the scriptures at a price people could afford to buy. The Bible Society works together with many organizations in India to translate the Bible into various languages of India. The Bible is now available in 74 Indian languages,  the New Testament in 92 additional languages, Braille Bibles in 15 Indian languages for visually impaired people, and Scripture portions in 48 languages.

History
On 21 February 1811, a meeting was held "at the college of Fort William for the propriety of instituting a Bible Society, as Auxiliary to the British and Foreign Bible Society established in London", entitled "The Calcutta Auxiliary Bible Society" with the same objectives as those in London." This Auxiliary Bible Society in Serampore, West Bengal first began an attempt to coordinate the supply of Scriptures to existing Christians in Portuguese, Tamil, Cingalese, Malayalam, and Canarese languages. They sent 5,000 Cingalese (Sinhalese) New Testaments to a new Auxiliary Bible Society in Ceylon formed in August 1812.

The headquarters of the Bible Society of India moved from Nagpur to Bangalore in 1950, under the leadership of General Secretary Premanand Mahanty. The Central Office of the Bible Society of India is located in Bangalore city in the state of Karnataka in South India.

The Translations

Sources for translating and revising
The Society depends on original sources material of the scriptures available in Biblical Hebrew, Biblical Aramaic and Biblical Greek languages for which the sources include the Biblia Hebraica Stuttgartensia and the Novum Testamentum Graece.

Pool of Scholars trained in Biblical languages
Since the beginning, the Society worked together with the National Council of Churches in India and the Senate of Serampore College (University) and the first Translations Director, C. Arangaden helped found the Society for Biblical Studies in India (SBSI) which had been fully-ecumenical consisting of Biblical Scholars from the Catholic, Orthodox, Protestant, and Charismatic Church Societies.

Father Rene Van de Walle a member of the Society for Biblical Studies in India was associated with the revision of the Marathi Bible.  Similarly, Father Lucien Legrand was associated with the inter-confessional translation in Tamil language.  With this background, the Society systematically built up a pool of Biblical Scholars who specialised in Old Testament with Biblical Aramaic and Biblical Hebrew and also New Testament with Biblical Greek.  The Scholars include Yisu Das Tiwari, B. E. Devaraj, C. Arangaden, Victor Premasagar, E. C. John, K. V. Mathew, M. P. John, John Philipose, Gnana Robinson, G. Babu Rao, Timotheas Hembrom, Nitoy Achümi, Basil Rebera, S. John Theodore and others.

Inter-confessional translations
The Society translates and revises the scriptures from the original Biblical languages without prejudice to Protestant, Orthodox, Catholic or Charismatic.  As such, the translations of the Society are held in regard by the Christians.  Though the Catholics did not have scriptures in a language of their own, it was the outcome of the Second Vatican Council which paved way for the vernacular translations.

Old Testament and New Testament Scholars of the Catholic Churches worked together with the Society to either translate or revise vernacular translations and were also instrumental in inter-confessional translations. The Rev. Father D. S. Amalorpavadass was a strong proponent for the inter-confessional translations making the Bible Society to come out with one such version in Tamil language.  In other languages of India too, the Catholic Fathers were very much in favour of an inter-confessional translation.

In the recent times, the Society works together with the Conference of Catholic Bishops of India led by Fr. Govindu Rayanna, a New Testament Scholar and a member of the Society for Biblical Studies in India.

The Translation Directors
The Directors who led the translation at the Society were notable in the Senate of Serampore College (University) having taught at either the constituent College of the University or its affiliated institutions.  It was during the period of C. Arangaden that the translations department was built up together with the General Secretary, the rural Pastor, A. E. Inbanathan had much understanding of the Church and Christianity in India and worked together with the Senate of Serampore College (University).  It was during their tenure that thoroughbred Scholars were appointed throughout India leading to quality translations.

Management of the Society
The Society has been led by able administrators hailing from the Clergy.  During 1980 when a gap arose, the Society had to appoint Laymen for a temporary period but with the appointment of The Rev. M. Mani Chacko, an Old Testament Scholar and a member of the Society for Biblical Studies in India (SBSI), the Society is again led by the Clergy.

Trust Association
The India Bible Society Trust Association (IBSTA) is the main management body which runs the administration of the Bible Society of India and has been led by Theologians including Victor Premasagar, Navamani Elia Peter and other Clergy.

General Secretaries
Though General Secretaries were in short tenures, it was the rural Pastor, The Rev. A. E. Inbanathan who held the longest tenure and built up the society in all spheres in Translation, Promotion, Distribution and Resource Mobilisation.

Sowing Circle 
Sowing Circle is a triannual magazine published in English in Bangalore by the Bible Society of India, for private circulation, containing reviews of its work throughout the Indian subcontinent.

The magazine has often been referred to by Scholars and other Writers.  David Vumlallian Zou of the University of Delhi in The Pasts of a Fringe Community: Ethno-history and Fluid Identity of the Zou in Manipur has substantially cited the magazine in matters relating to translations in Zou language.

References

External links
Bible Society of India

Bible societies
Religious organizations established in 1811
1811 establishments in India
Affiliated institutions of the National Council of Churches in India